Harold Sydney Bride (11 January 1890 – 29 April 1956) was a British merchant seaman and the junior wireless officer on the ocean liner  during its ill-fated maiden voyage.

The men remained at their posts until the ship's power was almost completely out.

Bride was washed off the ship as the boat deck flooded, but managed to scramble onto the upturned lifeboat Collapsible 'B', and was rescued by the Carpathia later in the morning. Despite being injured, he helped Harold Cottam, the Carpathia wireless operator and a personal friend of his, transmit survivor lists and personal messages from the ship.

Early history
Harold Bride was born in Nunhead, London, England, in 1890 to Arthur Bride and Mary Ann Lowe. The youngest of five children, Bride lived with his family in Bromley. Between 1903-1922 the family lived in Ravensbourne Avenue, Shortlands and is commemorated with a blue plaque. After primary school, Bride decided he wanted to become a wireless operator and he worked in his family's business to help pay for training. He completed training for the Marconi Company in July 1911.

RMS Titanic

Stories have appeared that Bride knew Phillips before the Titanic, but Bride insisted that they had never met before Belfast. The Titanic left on her maiden voyage to New York City from Southampton, England, on 10 April. During the voyage, Bride and Phillips worked from the wireless room on the Boat Deck, sending out passengers' personal messages and receiving iceberg warnings from other ships. On 11 April, one day after the ship set sail, Phillips and Bride celebrated Phillips' 25th birthday, with pastries brought from the first-class dining room.

On the evening of 14 April 1912 Bride had gone to bed early in preparation to relieve Jack Phillips at midnight, two hours earlier than normal. The wireless had not been working earlier and Phillips was busy catching up on a backlog of passengers' personal messages being sent to Cape Race, Newfoundland.

The Titanic hit the iceberg at 11:40 pm that night and began sinking. Bride woke up shortly after and asked Phillips what was happening. Phillips said they had struck something; Bride acknowledged Phillips and began to get ready to go on duty. Captain Edward Smith soon came into the wireless room alerting Bride and Phillips to be ready to send out a distress signal. Shortly after midnight, Smith came in and told them to request help and gave them the ship's position.

Phillips sent out CQD while Bride took messages to the Captain about which ships were coming to the Titanic assistance. At one point Bride reminded Phillips that the new code was SOS and jokingly said, "Send SOS, it's the new call, and it may be your last chance to send it." Later Phillips took a quick break and Bride took over the wireless. Phillips soon returned to the wireless room reporting that the forward part of the ship was flooded and that they should put on more clothes and life vests. Bride began to get dressed while Phillips went back to work on the wireless machine.

The wireless power was almost out when Captain Smith arrived and told the men that they had done their duty and that they were relieved. Phillips continued working while Bride gathered some money and personal belongings. Bride later remembered being moved by the way Phillips continued working. When his back was turned a crew member had sneaked in and was taking Phillips' life vest. Bride, outraged at the man's behaviour, attacked the man and might have hit him with an object. The water was beginning to flood the wireless room as they both ran out of the wireless room, leaving the motionless crewman where he fell. Bride thought the man was "a stoker, or someone from below decks". Bride wrote later: "I did my duty. I hope I finished [the man]. I don't know. We left him on the cabin floor of the radio room, and he was not moving." The men then split up, Bride heading forward and Phillips heading aft. This was the last time Bride saw Phillips. Bride began helping remove one of the last two lifeboats, Collapsible B, off the roof of the officers' quarters. The crew was unable to launch the boat before it was washed off the deck upside down. Bride was also washed off the deck and found himself in the sea beneath the overturned boat. He swam out from under and climbed onto the boat, on which he and 15 other men were able to survive, although the collapsible was waterlogged and slowly sinking. Bride and the others on B were later assisted into other lifeboats and were eventually taken aboard the RMS Carpathia.

On the Carpathia, the seriously injured Bride rested, and later helped the Carpathia's wireless operator, Harold Cottam, send out the large number of personal messages from the survivors.  According to Encyclopedia Titanica: "Incidentally, Bride and Cottam had met before the disaster and were good friends. After the tragedy they stayed in contact for many years."

Post-Titanic

Bride, who had to be carried off the Carpathia because of injuries to his feet (one was badly sprained, the other foot frostbitten), was met in New York City by Guglielmo Marconi and The New York Times, which gave Bride $1,000 for his exclusive story, "Thrilling Story by Titanic's Surviving Wireless Man". Bride later gave testimony in the American and British inquiries into the Titanic disaster, describing what iceberg warnings had been received and what had happened the night of the disaster.

In the American inquiry, Bride was also questioned about ignoring requests for information, while on the Carpathia, from the press and the United States Navy, which wanted to know the fate of President Taft's personal friend and aide Archibald Butt. Bride stated that priority had been given to personal messages and survivor lists over answering questions from the press and claimed that the Navy did not understand British Morse signals, which the Navy denied. The Marconi Company was accused of secretly setting up the New York Times interview with Bride and telling him and Harold Cottam to keep quiet until they arrived in New York, but Marconi denied the accusations. This matter was not pursued, and Bride was considered one of the heroes of the disaster. Despite being a key witness in the inquiries, Bride kept a low profile after the sinking. 

Before sailing on the Titanic, on 16 March 1912 he became engaged to Mabel Ludlow, but he broke off the engagement in September when he met Lucy Downie, whom he married on 10 April 1920. In August 1912, London via Melbourne records show Bride being aboard the SS Medina as a Marconi operator. During World War I, Bride served as the wireless operator on the steamship Mona’s Isle, and in 1922 he and Lucy moved to Glasgow, where Bride became a salesman. They had three children: Lucy in 1921, John in 1924 and Jeanette in 1929.

Death
Bride died aged 66 of lung cancer on 29 April 1956 in Glasgow. His body was cremated at Glasgow, and his ashes were scattered in the garden of the crematorium's chapel.

Portrayals
David McCallum (1958) (A Night to Remember)
Barry Pepper (1996) (Titanic) (TV miniseries)
Craig Kelly (1997) (Titanic)
Martin Moran (1999) — Titanic (Broadway musical)
Steve Kearney (1999) (The Titanic Chronicles) (TV documentary) (voice only)
Jake Swing (2012) (The Last Signals)

See also 
Sinking of the RMS Titanic
United States Senate inquiry into the sinking of the RMS Titanic
British Titanic inquiry

Notes

References

Further reading

External links
 

1890 births
1956 deaths
British Merchant Service personnel of World War I
British Merchant Navy officers
Telegraphists
Deaths from lung cancer in Scotland
RMS Titanic survivors